The Eastern Zone was one of the three regional zones of the 1983 Davis Cup.

10 teams entered the Eastern Zone in total, with the winner promoted to the following year's World Group. India defeated Japan in the final and qualified for the 1984 World Group.

Participating nations

Draw

First round

Sri Lanka vs. Hong Kong

Philippines vs. Malaysia

Quarterfinals

Sri Lanka vs. India

Chinese Taipei vs. Thailand

South Korea vs. Philippines

Japan vs. China

Semifinals

India vs. Thailand

Japan vs. South Korea

Final

Japan vs. India

References

External links
Davis Cup official website

Davis Cup Asia/Oceania Zone
Eastern Zone